Carpaţi II is a residential district of Satu Mare in Romania. It is named after the Carpathian Mountains.

Neighbour districts:
 North: Residential district Carpati I
 East: -
 South: Exit of Satu Mare
 Vest: Unio complex

References

Districts of Satu Mare